William-Fils "Willy" Aubameyang (born 16 February 1987) is a Gabonese former professional footballer who played as a defender. He is a half-brother of footballer Pierre-Emerick Aubameyang.

Club career

AC Milan
Aubameyang was born in Paris, France. He joined AC Milan from Triestina in 2005. Over his first three seasons at the club, he played in their youth teams, though appearing as an unused substitute for the first team in some Serie A and Coppa Italia games, as well as playing several pre-season friendlies (once even scoring against Juventus). On 20 December 2007, he eventually made his official debut in a Coppa Italia match against Catania. He did not appear in the league for Milan.

Loan spells
Aubameyang spent the following seasons on various loan spells: at Avellino in 2008–09, at Belgian side Eupen in 2009–10, and at Monza in the first half of the 2010–11 season.

Kilmarnock
In January 2011, he was signed permanently by Scottish Premier League club Kilmarnock, after a successful trial. He scored his first and only goal for the club in a 1–1 league draw against Motherwell. In summer 2011, Aubameyang's short-term contract with Kilmarnock expired and he left the club.

FC Kray
Aubameyang trialled with Borussia Dortmund II while his brother Pierre-Emerick played for the club's first team but did not earn a contract. Instead he signed for Regionalliga West club FC Kray in November 2014. In January 2016, he did not return from family holidays in Italy to appear for training at FC Kray and left the club which was fighting relegation.

International career
Aubameyang has been called up by the Gabon national team since 2009.

Personal life
His father Pierre is a former Gabonese international, while his two brothers Catilina and Pierre-Emerick are footballers too and have both played at A.C. Milan like him.

References

External links
 
 Profile at Assocalciatori.it 
 

Living people
1987 births
French sportspeople of Gabonese descent
People with acquired Gabonese citizenship
Gabonese footballers
Footballers from Paris
Association football midfielders
French footballers
Gabon international footballers
2010 Africa Cup of Nations players
Serie B players
Scottish Premier League players
Challenger Pro League players
A.C. Milan players
U.S. Triestina Calcio 1918 players
U.S. Avellino 1912 players
K.A.S. Eupen players
A.C. Monza players
Kilmarnock F.C. players
Sapins FC players
FC Kray players
Gabonese expatriate footballers
Gabonese expatriate sportspeople in Italy
Expatriate footballers in Italy
Gabonese expatriate sportspeople in the United Kingdom
Expatriate footballers in Scotland
Gabonese expatriate sportspeople in Belgium
Expatriate footballers in Belgium
Gabonese expatriate sportspeople in Germany
Expatriate footballers in Germany
Black French sportspeople